Pei (Pai) is a nearly extinct Sepik language spoken in Ambunti Rural LLG, East Sepik Province, Papua-New Guinea. It is spoken in villages such as Hauna of Ambunti Rural LLG.

References

Languages of East Sepik Province
Endangered Papuan languages
Walio languages